Filzbach is a former municipality in the canton of Glarus in Switzerland. Effective from 1 January 2011, Filzbach is part of the municipality of Glarus Nord.

History
Filzbach is first mentioned in 1394 as Vilentzspach.

Geography

Of this area, 35.4% is used for agricultural purposes, while 40.9% is forested. Of the rest of the land, 4.6% is settled (buildings or roads) and the remainder (19.1%) is non-productive (rivers, glaciers or mountains).

The municipality is located on a terrace of the Kerenzerberg mountain above the Walensee.  Talalpsee and Spaneggsee are located above the lake.

Demographics
Filzbach had a population (as of 2010) of 509.  , 10.2% of the population was made up of foreign nationals.  Over the last 10 years the population has decreased at a rate of -6.7%.  Most of the population speaks German  (92.6%), with Portuguese being second most common ( 1.3%) and Serbo-Croatian being third ( 1.3%).

In the 2007 federal election the most popular party was the SVP which received 50.9% of the vote.  Most of the rest of the votes went to the SPS with 42.5% of the vote.

In Filzbach about 66.5% of the population (between age 25-64) have completed either non-mandatory upper secondary education or additional higher education (either University or a Fachhochschule).

Filzbach has an unemployment rate of 0.43%.  , there were 33 people employed in the primary economic sector and about 15 businesses involved in this sector.  2 people are employed in the secondary sector and there are 2 businesses in this sector.  190 people are employed in the tertiary sector, with 21 businesses in this sector.

The historical population is given in the following table:

References

External links

 

Former municipalities of the canton of Glarus